Battle of Łódź may refer to:

 Battle of Łódź (1914) during World War I
 Battle of Łódź (1939) during the German invasion of Poland